Elvis In Concert is a posthumous 1977 television special starring Elvis Presley. It was Elvis' third and final TV special, following Elvis (a.k.a. The '68 Comeback Special) and Aloha From Hawaii. It was filmed during Presley's final tour in the cities of Omaha, Nebraska, on June 19, 1977, and Rapid City, South Dakota, on June 21, 1977. It was broadcast on CBS on October 3, 1977, two months after Presley's death. It was transmitted by the BBC in the United Kingdom on June 9, 1978. Unlike the majority of Elvis' programs, it is unlikely to be commercially released on home video and is only available in bootleg form.Elvis Information Network: Elvis in Concert VCD Review . This is because it showed Elvis near the end of his life when he was overweight and addicted to prescription drugs, and much of his performance reflects his poor health. However, parts of the special were used in the video documentary Elvis: The Great Performances and the theatrical documentary This is Elvis, both of which were released on home video. Parts of the special were recreated for the movie Elvis, specifically Presley's performance of "Unchained Melody".

Description
On June 1, 1977, it was announced that Elvis Presley had signed a deal with CBS for a new television special. It was agreed that CBS would videotape concerts during the summer of 1977. The final special was culled from footage of two performances, on June 19, 1977, in Omaha, and June 21, 1977, in Rapid City, South Dakota; albeit much of the footage from Omaha was considered unusable due to sound and performance problems. This concert has been heavily edited and bootlegs have appeared on auction web sites over the years. The show was shot on NTSC videotape although many film conversions have appeared over the years. The crew also filmed footage of Elvis at the airport in Indianapolis on June 26. This is the last known footage of Elvis ever filmed, and he can be seen wearing his favorite DEA jacket.

During the special, Presley performs a number of songs spanning his career.  During one song, "Are You Lonesome Tonight?," just before Elvis goes into the recitation part of the song, the music is faded down and a devoted female fan is shown talking about her determination to see Elvis live in concert, then it switches back to Elvis after the recitation was finished.  This may have been done so that viewers would not have to see Elvis fumbling through the recitation, although this footage was included in the later documentary This Is Elvis to illustrate his poor condition at the time, and the recitation was left intact on the soundtrack album as well.  However, not all agree that this explanation is the proper one, and the case has been made that Elvis regularly played around with the words during the recitation of the song when performing it onstage, with this being an example of that rather than it being a case of poor memory. Indeed, a concert recording of Presley similarly joking around during the recitation of "Are You Lonesome Tonight?" dating from 1969 has been issued by RCA on numerous occasions. Dubbed the "Laughing Version" (due to Elvis breaking into fits of laughter during the recitation), it even made the UK charts after Presley's death; and he also poked fun at the song during his 1968 Comeback Special, pretending to mumble the recitation instead of speaking it. His final album, Moody Blue, also included a live rendition of "Little Darlin'", recorded earlier in 1977, in which Presley similarly poked fun at that song's recitation portion.

Presley also sings his much-performed "My Way," although he has to use a lyric sheet on this occasion, despite having performed the song several years through the 1970s without having to refer to a lyric sheet. Presley also left both of his then-current singles, “Moody Blue” and “Way Down,” off the setlist; earlier in the tour, Presley had forgotten the lyrics to "Moody Blue" when attempting to perform it in North Carolina on February 20. Due to multiple audience requests the following night (also in North Carolina), Presley performed "Moody Blue" once again for the first and last time live and complete, lyrics in hand, the only time he would do so in his lifetime.

According to Roy Carr and Mick Farren in Elvis: The Illustrated Record, CBS officials considered postponing broadcast of the special in hopes of obtaining better performance footage of Presley, but his death in August 1977 cancelled this plan. Its broadcast received mixed reaction; Carr and Farren condemned it as a "travesty", adding, "Had it been shown during his lifetime, it would have caused more irrevocable damage to what was left of his career than almost a decade of starring in third-rate movies."

A misconception regarding Elvis in Concert stems from a statement broadcast by Presley's father, Vernon Presley at the program's conclusion (and also included on the soundtrack album) in which he told viewers that they had just witnessed Elvis' final performance. In fact, Presley made five more concert appearances before giving what would be his final show in Indianapolis, Indiana, on June 26. However, the CBS special was Elvis' last professionally recorded concert. The special actually contains two messages by Elvis' father: one taped in a hotel room during the tour in June when Elvis was still alive, and the other taped in the back office of Graceland in September, shortly after his death, where Vernon thanks the many people who sent letters and cards after Elvis' death.

Reviews
Allmusic called it Presley's worst, saying, "it's hard to believe that CBS-TV actually would have aired the show if Presley hadn't died two months later, making it his final recorded performance (and making his records big sellers again)." The fan site Elvis Information Network deemed the program "a challenging special to watch... The pudginess of his face and his substantial girth is a long way from the panther like sleekness exhibited in Elvis: That's the Way It Is, a documentary about Presley released in 1970."

It was the highest rated prime time program of the week upon its airing, with a 33.0 Nielsen rating representing 24.1 million homes.

 Official release 
This special has never been released on VHS, Betamax, LaserDisc, CED or DVD, and Elvis' estate has issued a statement saying that they have "no plans" to release the special, due to the fact that Elvis was visibly "far from his best in the way he looked and the way he performed". The company is long-believed to have a policy that refuses to license any product that portrays Elvis as overweight.

Footage from this special has, however, appeared elsewhere on home video: the performances of "Are You Lonesome Tonight", "Love Me" and "My Way" were used in 1981's This Is Elvis, and the performance of "Unchained Melody" (which was not featured on the original CBS telecast) appeared in the 1990 home video release The Great Performances, Volume One: Center Stage. And there has been no prohibition on the soundtrack being reissued over the years (see below). Some clips of the special were used as the basis of scenes in the movie Elvis directed by Baz Luhrmann.

 List of songs / scenes 
 Elvis fans' comments
 Footage of stage setup and pre-show souvenir sales
 Introduction ("Also sprach Zarathustra")
 "See See Rider"
 "That's All Right"
 "Are You Lonesome Tonight?" (combined with a fan's comment)
 "Teddy Bear/Don't Be Cruel"
 Elvis fans' comments
 "You Gave Me a Mountain"
 "Jailhouse Rock"
 Elvis fans' comments
 "How Great Thou Art"
 Elvis fans' comments
 "I Really Don't Want To Know"
 Elvis introduces his father, Vernon, and his girlfriend Ginger Alden
 "Hurt"
 "Hound Dog"
 "My Way"
 "Can't Help Falling in Love" (combined with Vernon's comment on Elvis' early career)
 Closing vamp
 Final message from Vernon Presley

 Personnel 
Elvis Presley – vocals, acoustic guitar, piano
James Burton – lead guitar
John Wilkinson – rhythm guitar
Charlie Hodge – acoustic guitar, vocals
Jerry Scheff – bass
Ronnie Tutt – drums 
Tony Brown – piano
The Sweet Inspirations, J.D. Sumner & the Stamps Quartet, Kathy Westmoreland – vocals
Joe Guercio – orchestra
Bobby Ogdin - electric piano and keyboard, clavinet

Soundtrack

RCA Records released a soundtrack album in conjunction with the television special's broadcast. The album augments the televised performances with a second album of additional recordings made during the Omaha and Rapid City concerts. The concert soundtrack album was released in October 1977 and reached #5 on the Billboard album charts. The album, however, omitted many of the features from the TV show; including some of the fans' comments, audio of the stage setup and souvenir sales, the fan's comment during "Are You Lonesome Tonight?", and Vernon Presley's comment during "Can't Help Falling in Love".

References

Notes

Bibliography
 Roy Carr and Mick Farren, Elvis: The Illustrated Record'' (Harmony Books, 1982).

External links 

For Elvis Fans Only: Elvis in Concert

1977 in American television
1977 television specials
1970s American television specials
Elvis Presley
Music of Omaha, Nebraska
CBS television specials
Music television specials